VG-1 may refer to:

VG-1 (cell line)
VG-1 (steel)
VG-1, one of the variants of the Volkssturmgewehr